Ollie Hoskins (born 6 March 1993) is an Australian rugby union international player who started his career as a prop for the Western Force in Super Rugby and signed with London Irish in March 2016.

Career

Hoskins was born and raised in Perth, Western Australia and represented his state at various age-group levels during his school days.   He was a member of the  training squad for both the 2012 and 2013 Super Rugby seasons.   During this time he gained useful international experience with appearances against  A in the IRB Nations Cup and a Tongan XV side at the beginning of 2013.

For 2014, Hoskins was named as a member of the Force's Wider Training Group alongside Brad Lacey, Dillyn Leyds, Dylan Sage and Francois van Wyk.

On 28 April 2016 it was announced that Hoskins would join Green King IPA Championship side London Irish for the 2016-17 season. Hoskins was a regular starter as Irish were promoted at the close of the 2016-17 RFU Championship season. Earning 24 caps in total. Since the 2016-17 season, Hoskins has racked up 64 caps for London Irish and in the 2018-19 season was voted Supporters Player of the Season.

International

Hoskins was the starting tighthead prop of the Australia Under-20 squad for the 2012 IRB Junior World Championship in South Africa and the 2013 tournament in France.

In 2021, Hoskins was drafted into Dave Rennie’s Wallabies squad to potentially cover for Taniela Tupou, who had suffered a head collision in the Scotland game, prior to their clash with England.  He made his debut at Twickenham coming on as a substitute on 13 November 2021.

Super Rugby statistics

References

External

https://www.london-irish.com/players/ollie-hoskins/s169399/

1993 births
Living people
Australia international rugby union players
Australian rugby union players
Australian expatriate sportspeople in England
London Irish players
Perth Spirit players
Rugby union players from Perth, Western Australia
Rugby union props
Sportsmen from Western Australia
Western Force players